Siligo is a comune (municipality) in the region of Logudoro - Meilogu in the Province of Sassari in the Italian region Sardinia, located about  north of Cagliari and about  southeast of Sassari.

Siligo borders the following municipalities: Ardara, Banari, Bessude, Bonnanaro, Codrongianos, Florinas, Mores, Ploaghe.

Main sights
Archeological site of Monte sant'Antoni: a prehistoric Federal Nuragic Sanctuary
Mesumundu Archaeological Park: an old Roman area and medieval
Church of Nostra Segnora de Mesumundu,  built in the Byzantine age (6th century AD) upon the ruins of a Roman baths (2nd century AD). The church was modified after 1065 by the Benedictine monks of Montecassino.
Church of Santi Elia ed Enoch: built on the top of the Monte Santo and modified by Benedictine monks after 1065.

People

Gavino Contini (1855-1915), poet
Rita Livesi, (1915), actress
Efisio Arru, (1927-2000), scientist
Maria Carta (1934-1994), folk singer and actress
Gavino Ledda, author of an autobiographical work Padre padrone (1975)

References

Cities and towns in Sardinia